Beautiful Wives Club is a 2018 Burmese drama television series. It aired on MRTV, from June 13, to August 29, 2018, on every Wednesday, Thursday and Friday at 19:15 for 30 episodes.

Cast
Soe Pyae Thazin as Thanbu Khin
Mya Hnin Yee Lwin as Madi Pyo May
May Barani Thaw as Amara Maung
Khin Thazin as Mar Yar
Pho Thauk Kyar as Thwin Htoo
Zay Ya as Dr. Su Thet Yin
Nay Yan as Ni Ti
Kyaw Kyaw as Thu Swe

References

Burmese television series
MRTV (TV network) original programming